The Provinces of Fiji, ("veiyasana" (pl.) and "yasana" (s.) in the Fijian language), are the 14 administrative units into which the country is divided, particularly in relation to the provision of resources and services to the indigenous Fijian population by the Fijian Affairs Board. They are more or less derived from the major clan affiliations for each provincial region.

Structure
The most basic administrative unit in modern Fijian communities is the koro (village). Each village is led by a village headman called the "turaga-ni-koro", who is elected by the other villagers. A subunit of the yasana is the tikina, which is composed of several koros. Each yasana is governed by a provincial council, mainly composed of well educated people, and chiefly Fijians, and headed up by an executive head, under the title "Roko Tui".

Provinces

The fourteen provinces and the present Roko Tui are:

 
Subdivisions of Fiji
Fiji, Provinces
Fiji 2
Provinces, Fiji
Provinces